Civic Space Park is an urban park in Downtown Phoenix, Arizona which first opened to the public in April 2009.  It is located directly across Central Avenue from the main part of the ASU Downtown Campus.  It is also located north of the Central Station METRO Light Rail and bus transfer stations.

History
The land the park is located on was a combination of old buildings and parking lots before the City of Phoenix began buying the properties. The main building renovated in the project is called the A.E. England Building. Originally opened in the 1920s as a car dealership, it now houses retail space and a community meeting room for special events. In the outdoor spaces, the majority of the park (over 70%) will be shaded, once all the trees have fully matured, through a combination of trees and shade structures. Solar panels covering the tops of the shade canopies produce a combined 75 kilowatts of power. The centerpiece of the park is the US$2.4 million sculpture by Janet Echelman called Her Secret Is Patience. At night ground-mounted colored lighting changes throughout the season and gives a different appearance to the daytime look. It was questionable whether or not the piece would be built as the leaders at the City of Phoenix changed their minds several times whether or not to build the art piece. In 2011 the park won the Rudy Bruner Award for Urban Excellence silver medal.

References

External links
 Park Website

Urban public parks
Parks in Arizona
Parks in Phoenix, Arizona
2009 establishments in Arizona